Mycobacterium lentiflavum
Etymology: Lentus from Latin for slow, flavus, Latin for yellow.

Description
Gram-positive, nonmotile and acid-fast coccobacilli.

Colony characteristics
Smooth colonies, with bright yellow pigmentation 1-2mm in diameter.

Physiology
Slow growth on Löwenstein-Jensen medium at temperatures between 22 °C and 37 °C within 3–4 weeks.
Generally resistant to isoniazid, rifampin, ethambutol and streptomycin.

Differential characteristics
Phylogenetic analysis, based on an evaluation of 16S rDNA sequences, places M. lentiflavum in an intermediate position between rapidly and slowly growing mycobacteria, closely related to Mycobacterium simiae and Mycobacterium genavense.

Pathogenesis
In young children with cervical lymphadenitis and in immunocompromised patients
One case of vertebral osteomyelitis reported
Biosafety level 2

Type strain
First isolated from a patient with spondylodiscitis (vertebral osteomyelitis). Further isolates from clinical specimens were obtained due to the use of contaminated bronchoscopes. Also recovered from gastric juice, sputum and urine samples.
Strain 2186/92 = ATCC 51985 = CCUG 42422 = CCUG 42559 = CIP 105465 = DSM 44418 = JCM 13390.

References

Springer et al. 1996. Isolation and characterization of a unique group of slowly growing mycobacteria: description of Mycobacterium lentiflavum sp. nov. J. Clin. Microbiol. 34, 1100–1107.

External links
Type strain of Mycobacterium lentiflavum at BacDive -  the Bacterial Diversity Metadatabase

Acid-fast bacilli
lentiflavum
Bacteria described in 1996